Matchwood may refer to:

 Matchwood Township, Michigan, U.S.
 Wood which has splintered small under impact
 Wood used to make matches